Itzgrund (valley of the Itz) is a municipality in the district of Coburg in Bavaria in Germany.

References

Coburg (district)